The 1892 Central Colonels football team represented Central University in Richmond, Kentucky during the 1892 college football season.

Schedule

References

Central
Eastern Kentucky Colonels football seasons
Central Colonels football